Frank Carter (born October 17, 1977) is a former American football fullback/linebacker who played seven seasons in the Arena Football League (AFL) with the New Jersey/Las Vegas Gladiators, Nashville Kats, Utah Blaze and San Jose SaberCats. He played college football at MacMurray College. He was also a member of the Duluth-Superior Lumberjacks and Quad City Steamwheelers.

Professional career
Carter played for the Duluth-Superior Lumberjacks of the Indoor Football League in 1999. He played for the Quad City Steamwheelers of the af2 from 2000 to 2001. He signed with the AFL's New Jersey Gladiators on November 16, 2001. Carter played for the team from 2002 to 2005, earning First Team All-Arena in 2005. He was signed by the Nashville Kats of the AFL on October 4, 2005. He played for the team during the 2006 season, earning All-Ironman Team recognition. Carter was traded to the Utah Blaze on October 11, 2006 for the rights to Tim McGill and Thal Woods, and played for the Blaze during the 2007 season. He signed with the San Jose SaberCats of the AFL on October 30, 2007 and played for the team during the 2008 season.

References

External links
Just Sports Stats

Living people
1977 births
Players of American football from Chicago
American football fullbacks
American football linebackers
African-American players of American football
MacMurray Highlanders football players
New Jersey Gladiators players
Las Vegas Gladiators players
Nashville Kats players
Utah Blaze players
San Jose SaberCats players
Quad City Steamwheelers players
21st-century African-American sportspeople
20th-century African-American sportspeople